The Battle of Kinston was fought on December 14, 1862, in Lenoir County, North Carolina, near the town of Kinston, as part of the Goldsboro Expedition of the American Civil War.

A Union expedition led by Brig. Gen. John G. Foster left New Bern in December to disrupt the Wilmington and Weldon Railroad at Goldsborough. The advance was stubbornly contested by Brig. Gen. Nathan Evans's brigade near Kinston Bridge on December 14, but the Confederates were outnumbered and withdrew north of the Neuse River in the direction of Goldsborough. Foster continued his movement the next day, taking the River Road, south of the Neuse River.

References

External links
 Battle of Kinston NCpedia
 Kinston Battlefield Park
 CWSAC Report Update

Gallery

Goldsboro Expedition
Battles of the Eastern Theater of the American Civil War
Union victories of the American Civil War
Battles of the American Civil War in North Carolina
National Register of Historic Places in Lenoir County, North Carolina
1862 in the American Civil War
1862 in North Carolina
North Carolina in the American Civil War
Historic districts on the National Register of Historic Places in North Carolina
Conflict sites on the National Register of Historic Places in North Carolina
December 1862 events